Matthew David Lewis (born 27 June 1989) is an English actor. He is best known for his role as Neville Longbottom in the Harry Potter film series.

Born in Leeds, Lewis made his acting debut in Some Kind of Life (1995), guest-starring on dramas for ITV and BBC One before appearing in Harry Potter and the Philosopher's Stone (2001). Lewis played the role for ten years, concluding with the final film, Harry Potter and the Deathly Hallows – Part 2 (2011), for which he received critical praise. Following the series, Lewis recurred in The Syndicate and performed his first theatre role in Our Boys at the Duchess Theatre in 2012.

Lewis starred in The Rise (2012) which premiered at the Toronto International Film Festival to positive reviews and made appearances on BBC dramas Bluestone 42 and Death in Paradise in 2013 and 2015, respectively. Lewis had a supporting role in Me Before You (2016), which became a box office success. He was cast in the crime dramas Ripper Street and Happy Valley before starring on the ITV drama Girlfriends in 2018. Lewis appeared in Terminal (2018), which premiered at the Edinburgh International Film Festival as well as Baby Done (2020). Since 2020, Lewis has starred in Channel 5 television series All Creatures Great and Small to critical praise.

Early life
Matthew David Lewis was born on 27 June 1989 in Leeds, West Yorkshire, to Adrian Lewis and Lynda Needham. He was raised in the nearby town of Horsforth. He has two older brothers: Chris, a film editor, and Anthony, an actor. He was educated at St Mary's Menston Catholic Voluntary Academy.

Career

1995–2000: Beginnings
Lewis has been acting since age five. He made his professional debut in television film Some Kind of Life (1995), directed by Kay Mellor. He guest-starred in the BBC One crime drama Dalziel and Pascoe before appearing in ITV series' Heartbeat and Where the Heart Is in 1999 and 2000, respectively.

2001–2011: Harry Potter and recognition

In 1999, castings were held across the UK for Harry Potter and the Philosopher's Stone, the film adaptation of British author J. K. Rowling's novel. Lewis, a fan of the series, initially attended an open audition at the Queens Hotel, Leeds, before being contacted two months later to perform a screen test for director Chris Columbus, eventually earning the role of Neville Longbottom. Harry Potter and the Philosopher's Stone was released in 2001 and became a critical and commercial hit. For the role, Lewis wore a set of false teeth, shoes two sizes too big, a fat suit and ear prosthetics. He reprised his role a year later in Harry Potter and the Chamber of Secrets; Lewis has stated that his favorite lines stem from the film.

Harry Potter and the Prisoner of Azkaban (2004) and Harry Potter and the Goblet of Fire (2005) both premiered to critical acclaim. Harry Potter and the Order of the Phoenix was released in 2007. During filming, co-star Helena Bonham Carter accidentally ruptured Lewis' eardrum when she stuck her wand in his ear during a scene. Lewis commented on enjoying the "diverse nature" of his role in the film which contained more "emotion and drama" than its predecessors. Harry Potter and the Half-Blood Prince became the second-highest-grossing film of 2009. In a 2009 interview, Lewis spoke about his experience working with director David Yates, discussing "about what Neville would be doing and feeling, even [..] in the background." In April 2011, Lewis made his stage debut as Lester Cole in Agatha Christie's Verdict touring production.

Lewis returned once more for the final Harry Potter installments, Harry Potter and the Deathly Hallows – Part 1 (2010) and Harry Potter and the Deathly Hallows – Part 2 (2011). His performance was praised by critics for his "scene stealing potential"; CTV News referred to Lewis as a "breakout stud" and "man of action". Harry Potter author J. K. Rowling gave a speech at the premiere of Deathly Hallows – Part 2 in London, where she stated that there were seven major cast members in the series, whom she referred to as "The Big Seven" (Daniel Radcliffe, Rupert Grint, Emma Watson, Tom Felton, Lewis, Evanna Lynch and Bonnie Wright).

2012–present: Further work and television

In 2012, Lewis portrayed Jamie Bradley in Kay Mellor's five-part BBC One television drama The Syndicate. He made his West End debut, playing Mick in Our Boys, at the Duchess Theatre from September to December 2012. Lewis co-starred in the 2012 crime film The Rise, which premiered at the Toronto International Film Festival. Express stated that "Lewis provide[s] as much pleasure as the mechanics of the twisted revenge plot." He starred in two series of the South Africa filmed black comedy Bluestone 42, which premiered on BBC Three in 2013. In 2015, Lewis guest-starred on the television crime drama Death in Paradise.

Lewis played Patrick, the boyfriend of Emilia Clarke's character, in Me Before You (2016), which proved to be a commercial success. Bustle noted that "Lewis' role is one mostly of comedic relief" but the actor "plays the character's outrage perfectly"; Lewis stated he was careful not to make the role a "laughed-off villain, but a fully-formed character." That same year, Lewis reoccurred in two BBC productions, crime dramas Ripper Street and Happy Valley. He starred alongside Niamh Cusack in the London premiere of Unfaithful, written by playwright Owen McCafferty, from August to October 2016. In 2017, Lewis, a friend of comedian Sal Vulcano, made an appearance on Impractical Jokers as himself filling in for Vulcano, which was shot at Universal Orlando.

In 2018, he starred on the ITV drama Girlfriends, written by Mellor, and appeared in the 2018 neo-noir Terminal, which premiered at the Edinburgh International Film Festival to negative reviews. Lewis starred opposite Rose Matafeo in Baby Done (2020), produced by Taika Waititi. The Guardian praised his "thoroughly likable performance" as well as the "laid-back" chemistry between him and Matafeo. Lewis appeared in the Yorkshire-set television series All Creatures Great and Small, which aired on Channel 5 in 2020 to high ratings and critical acclaim. The New York Times referred to Lewis' portrayal as a "dashing suitor" who achieved the character's "natural confidence [..] incredibly well." The programme was renewed for a second series in December 2020.

Personal life
Lewis married Angela Jones in Italy on 28 May 2018, after the two had become engaged in November 2016. The couple had met in January 2016, when Lewis participated in the annual Celebration of Harry Potter event at Universal Orlando, where Jones was a VIP event manager for the resort and the event.
 
Lewis is a vice-president of the Leeds Rugby Foundation charity. Lewis hosts the Leeds United podcast "Doing a Leeds" with former professional footballer Jermaine Beckford.
In February 2021, it was announced that Lewis became the first Patron of the Bambisanani Partnership.

Filmography

Film

Television

Music video

Theatre

Video game

Theme Park

Honours
On 24 July 2012, Lewis received an honorary Master of Arts degree from Leeds Metropolitan University for his contribution to the arts and charity work.

References

External links

 

1989 births
Living people
21st-century English male actors
English male child actors
English male film actors
English male stage actors
English male television actors
English male video game actors
Male actors from Leeds
People educated at St. Mary's Catholic High School, Menston